Asbjørn Sennels (born 17 January 1979) is a former Danish professional football (soccer) player, who played as a left back. He has played two games for the Denmark national football team.

Biography
Born in Brabrand, Sennels played for local lower-league clubs Brabrand IF and IK Skovbakken. He got his breakthrough with Superliga club Viborg FF in the 1999-00 Superliga season, and was soon called up for the Danish under-21 national team. He played 108 league games for Viborg, and was called up for the Danish national team in August 2003. In February 2004, during the 2003–04 winter transfer window, he was bought by league rivals Brøndby IF.

Brøndby manager Michael Laudrup bought Sennels to replace Aurelijus Skarbalius on the left back position. Sennels made his Brøndby debut in the 2004 UEFA Cup matches with FC Barcelona. He was called up for his second and last national team game in April 2004. His first time playing in the Brøndby was less than perfect, and it did not help him that he was replacing the fan favourite Skarbalius. Sennels found his feet and played all 33 Brøndby matches in the 2004–05 Superliga season, as the club won the championship title, as well as the Danish Cup trophy. Laudrup bought Joseph Elanga to challenge Sennels for the left back position, and he played 19 of 33 matches in the following season.

When Laudrup was replaced by Rene Meulensteen as Brøndby manager, Sennels was sent further down the pecking order by on-loan left back Adam Eckersley. When Meulensteen left Brøndby halfway through the 2006–07 Superliga season, Sennels was told by replacement manager Tom Køhlert that he had no future at the club. In the summer 2007, he moved back to Viborg FF.

Later career
Sennels retired from professional football in the summer 2012, as his job as a high school teacher did not harmonize with his football career. However, he still played for Viborg FF's reserve team in the Denmark Series and as of the summer 2017, he functioned as a player-assistant coach for the team.

In the summer 2018, Sennels returned to Danish seventh division club Tjele Vest Sport as a player-assistant coach. In January 2020, he was promoted to player-head coach.

Honours
 Danish Superliga: 2004–05
 Danish Cup: 2004–05

References

External links

Danish national team profile
 Brøndby IF profile
Career stats by Danmarks Radio

1979 births
Living people
Danish men's footballers
Viborg FF players
Brøndby IF players
Denmark international footballers
Denmark under-21 international footballers
Footballers from Aarhus
Association football defenders
VSK Aarhus players